The Gansu Dunhuang Solar Park is a 50-megawatt (MW) photovoltaic power station located in the Gansu Province, in China. All of the modules, which range from 230 to 240 watts, are mounted at a fixed tilt angle of 38°. It is located in the Photoelectricity Park of Dunhuang City. China's first solar power plant, 10 MW, was built here and commissioned on 30 September 2009. An additional 95 MW is expected in 2013, and 5,000 MW by 2020.

See also

List of photovoltaic power stations
Photovoltaic power station
Photovoltaics

References

External links
 

Photovoltaic power stations in China